The Arab Rugby Sevens Women's Tournament, is an annual rugby sevens tournament for women involving Arab nations, organised by the Arab Rugby Federation. It is contested on an annual basis.

Results by year

Team Records 

<div id="*">* hosts

See also
Arab Rugby Sevens Men's Tournament
Africa Women's Sevens
Asia Rugby Women's Sevens Series

External links
البطولات العربية لسباعيات الرجبي - ARF official website
Arab Championship Overview - rugbyarchive.net

Women's rugby sevens competitions
Women's rugby union competitions for national teams
2021 establishments